The 1982 CFL Draft composed of six rounds where 72 Canadian football players were chosen from eligible Canadian universities and Canadian players playing in the NCAA. A total of 18 players were selected as territorial exemptions, with every team making at least one selection during this stage of the draft.

Territorial exemptions

Toronto Argonauts                                   Geoff Townsend  TB  Boston College

Toronto Argonauts                                       Stephen Delcol  DT  Simon Fraser

Montreal Concordes                                  Luc Tousignant  QB  Fairmont State

Calgary Stampeders  Ken Moore  TE  Hawaii

Calgary Stampeders  Greg Peterson  DB  Brigham Young University

Calgary Stampeders                                      Kevin Molle  OL  Fresno State

Saskatchewan Roughriders                            Brent Molnar  OL  Minot State

British Columbia Lions                              Dennis Guevin              OT               Simon Fraser

British Columbia Lions                                  Gerald Roper  G  Arizona

Winnipeg Blue Bombers                               Milson Jones  TB  North Dakota

Winnipeg Blue Bombers                                   Stan Mikawos               DT             North Dakota

Hamilton Tiger-Cats                                 Kari Yli-Renko  T  Cincinnati

Ottawa Rough Riders                                 Mark Seale  DT  Richmond

Ottawa Rough Riders                                     Kevin Dalliday  G/DT  Carleton

Ottawa Rough Riders                                     Ron St. Poulton  DB  McGill

Edmonton Eskimos                                    Nereo Bolzon  LB  Alberta

Edmonton Eskimos                                        Peter Eshenko              WR              Alberta

Edmonton Eskimos  Greg Marshall  FB  Western Ontario

1st round

2nd round
10. Edmonton Eskimos                                    Harry Doering  DE  Guelph

11. Montreal Alouettes                                  Clint Van Ostrand  OL  Whitworth

12. Calgary Stampeders                                  Robert Waite                   DL            British Columbia

13. Saskatchewan Roughriders                            Gerald Prud'homme  WR  Concordia

14. British Columbia Lions  Don Moen                   DB            British Columbia

15. Winnipeg Blue Bombers                               Derek Faggiani             DT            Simon Fraser

16. Hamilton Tiger-Cats                                 Dave Zilli                 LB             Toronto

17. Hamilton Tiger-Cats                                 Peter Langford             DE             Guelph

18. Edmonton Eskimos                                    Mark Debrueys              TE             Western Ontario

3rd round
19. Calgary Stampeders                                  Phil Charron  WR  Bishop's

20. Toronto Argonauts                                   Marc Lemery                LB              McGill

21. Calgary Stampeders                                  Dave Amer                  WR              Bishop's

22. Saskatchewan Roughriders  Mike Hughes  T  Sheridan

23. British Columbia Lions  Ryan Potter                TB              Western Ontario

24. Winnipeg Blue Bombers                               Dan Bowes  DE  McMaster

25. British Columbia Lions                              Bernie Jolette  LB  Ottawa

26. Ottawa Rough Riders                                 Terry Cahill  DB  East Stroudsberg State

27. Edmonton Eskimos                                    Peter Janiuk  G  York

4th round
28. British Columbia Lions                              David Singh                TB              British Columbia

29. Montreal Alouettes  Larry Stewart              T               Saint Mary's

30. Calgary Stampeders                                  Rod Ambrose  G  Manitoba

31. Saskatchewan Roughriders                            Pierre Lord                WR              Fairmount State

32. British Columbia Lions                              Dave Leuty                 WR              Western Ontario

33. Winnipeg Blue Bombers                               Darrin Boivin              DL              Manitoba

34. Hamilton Tiger-Cats  David McCann               WR              Western Ontario

35. Ottawa Rough Riders                                 Bruce Milks  DB  South Arkansas

36. Edmonton Eskimos                                    David Sauve  DE  Harvard

5th round
37. Saskatchewan Roughriders  James Williams  DE  Acadia

38. Montreal Concordes                                 Carmen Salvatore            DB                Wilfrid Laurier

39. Calgary Stampeders                                  Denis Tardif               LB                McGill

40. Saskatchewan Roughriders                            Kevin Rydeard              DB                Western Ontario

41. British Columbia Lions                              Tony Prencipe              LB                Manitoba

42. Winnipeg Blue Bombers                               Sam Papaconstantinou       LB                Toronto

43. Hamilton Tiger-Cats                                 Dave Purve                 TE                Simon Fraser

44. Ottawa Rough Riders                                 Terry Elik                 LB                Simon Fraser

45. Edmonton Eskimos                                    Barry Quarrel              DB                Wilfrid Laurier

6th round
46. Saskatchewan Roughriders                            Paul Starkey               C                 Eastern Oregon

47. Montreal Concordes  Fred West                  DE                Wilfrid Laurier

48. Calgary Stampeders                                  Stuart Maclean             LB                Acadia

49. Saskatchewan Roughriders                            Mark Joncas                DT                McGill

50. British Columbia Lions                              Matt Kavanaugh             C                 Simon Fraser

51. Winnipeg Blue Bombers                               Mitch Kiesman              DE                Manitoba

52. Hamilton Tiger-Cats                                 Scott Waggoner  TB  Florida

53. Ottawa Rough Riders                                 Greg Clarke                QB                 British Columbia

54. Edmonton Eskimos                                    Rick Paulitsch             TB                 Alberta

References
Canadian Draft

Canadian College Draft
Cfl Draft, 1982